Lambda Cephei (λ Cephei) is a fifth magnitude blue supergiant star in the constellation Cepheus, one of the hottest and most luminous visible to the naked eye.

Characteristics
It is a hot O6.5 supergiant star at a distance of approximately 1,980 light years, whose absolute brightness around half a million times the Sun. Its radius is around 20 times that of the latter, with a mass that has been estimated to be between 45 and 60 solar masses.

Lambda Cephei turns around its axis in less than three days compared to the 24.47 days that the Sun needs to complete a full rotation and seems to be single, with no companions. Its ultimate fate is to explode as a supernova leaving behind a neutron star or perhaps a black hole.

Lambda Cephei is also a runaway star that seems to have been expelled of the stellar association Cepheus OB3, that lies at 2,800 light-years, roughly 2,5 million years ago. Its motion through the interstellar medium is producing a shockwave in front of the gases that surround it and in the direction towards it moves.

References

External links
 http://stars.astro.illinois.edu/Sow/lambdacep.html

O-type supergiants
Emission-line stars
Runaway stars
Cepheus (constellation)
Durchmusterung objects
Cephei, Lambda
Cephei, 22
210839
109556
8469